Leslie Maurin Thompkins (sometimes spelled Tompkins) is a fictional character appearing in comic books published by DC Comics, usually as a supporting character in stories featuring Batman, of whom she is an ally. Created by writer Dennis O'Neil and artist Dick Giordano, she first appeared in Detective Comics #457 (March 1976).

She debuted in-live action in 2015 on Fox's television series Gotham, where she was portrayed by Morena Baccarin. On the HBO Max series Titans, she was portrayed by Krista Bridges in the third season.

Publication history
Created by writer Dennis O'Neil and artist Dick Giordano, she first appeared in Detective Comics #457 (March 1976). She was based on the Catholic pacifist Dorothy Day.

A close friend and medical colleague of Thomas Wayne, Leslie serves as a surrogate parent to his son Bruce after his parents are murdered, and later becomes a confidant in his crusade as Batman. In addition to being one of Batman's allies, Leslie is also a renowned medical professional who has dedicated her considerable skills toward helping Gotham City's less fortunate.

Fictional character biography
Leslie Thompkins made her first appearance in Detective Comics #457, in which she is depicted as comforting the young Bruce Wayne on the night that his parents were murdered. Inspired, she dedicates her life to helping slum kids avoid a life of crime. Every year on the anniversary of his parents' murder, Batman visits Leslie in Park Row (which was now referred to as Crime Alley). However, Leslie has no idea he is the boy she had helped decades before.

In later years, Leslie is portrayed as having been a close friend and colleague of Thomas Wayne, Bruce's father. She takes it upon herself to look after Bruce after the boy's parents are murdered, often acting with the family butler Alfred Pennyworth as a parental figure and guardian. In Batman Special #1 (1984), after costumed cop-killer Wrath dies in combat with Batman, Leslie comforts Wrath's grieving girlfriend much as she had young Bruce. She also eventually learns that Bruce is Batman.

Wrath's girlfriend, former Mafioso Gayle Hudson, becomes a close friend to Leslie. At one point this protects Leslie from two attackers, who fear what retribution Gayle might bring.

Leslie disapproves of Bruce's vigilantism, and feels partly responsible for his transformation into Batman, fearing that somehow she failed him as a role model. She has also been linked to Alfred romantically on more than one occasion.

She runs a clinic for criminals and drug addicts in Gotham City. While the majority of her patients are repeat offenders, she continues to do her job with great perseverance and determination. During the No Man's Land storyline, she runs Gotham's only medical clinic, operating under a strict 'No Violence' policy regardless of her patients' actions and intent. Even Killer Croc respects the rule and stays out.

Sometime after No Man's Land, it is revealed she has a brother named Jeremiah. She asks Jean Paul Valley to find him.

Stephanie Brown suffers serious injuries at the hands of Black Mask during the War Games crossover, and is taken to Leslie's clinic for treatment. Initially thinking Stephanie died of her injuries, Batman later discovers, during the War Crimes storyline, that Leslie deliberately treated her improperly, resulting in her death while hoping that it would teach Batman the lesson that his constant use of children as partners was only putting their lives in danger.

After liquidating her assets and giving them to Stephanie's daughter, she flees to Africa. Batman follows her and forces a confession, coldly informing her that he may not stop violence, but he had never thrown another body onto the pile in the hopes of making a statement. He warns her that she is now just another murderer in his eyes, and if she ever returned to the United States or practiced medicine again, he would bring her to justice.

A mysterious familiar figure has been stalking Tim Drake wearing Stephanie's Spoiler costume, which at one point Tim thinks he imagined it to be Stephanie herself. The stalker indeed turns out to be Stephanie. It was revealed that Leslie faked the girl's death and switched the body with an overdose victim who had a similar body type.

A 2008 Robin/Spoiler one-shot special shows both Leslie and Stephanie alive and in exile, protecting a village somewhere in Africa.

After the events of Batman: Battle for the Cowl Leslie Thompkins has once again set up shop in Gotham, attempting to start over and continue to help unfortunates. She gained the Cavalier as her bodyguard and has, along with Barbara Gordon, begun helping a former associate of the Teen Titans named Wendy Harris deal with the loss of the use of her legs. Leslie has been welcomed back warmly by Alfred and Dick Grayson. Tim Drake, however, maintains a frosty attitude towards her due to her actions regarding Stephanie.

The New 52
In 2011, The New 52 rebooted the DC universe. Leslie Thompkins appears, younger than she is usually depicted, in the pages of Red Hood and the Outlaws. She is featured in Jason Todd's flashbacks as the Red Hood: she took him in at her clinic in Gotham City after he was beaten within an inch of his life by Joker.

At the offices of Gotham Child Services, Killer Croc makes a violent entrance, startling Leslie and demanding that Jade be returned to him so that he can give her the things he never had. Leslie admits that Jade has been returned to the Ibanescu family.

DC Rebirth
In 2016, DC Comics implemented another relaunch of its books called DC Rebirth, which restored its continuity to a form much as it was prior to The New 52. Leslie has a secret clinic set up in an abandoned building previously used as a base by Azrael (Jean-Paul Valley), where she is treating his injuries from a bombing earlier in the story. She is shown to disapprove of Batman's plan to "get teenagers involved" meaning the team Batman and Batwoman had assembled in the recent Detective Comics.

She was attacked and apparently killed after being infected with a variation of Joker Toxin. It is revealed that the whole event was only a simulation.

Alternate versions
During the 2015 "Convergence" storyline, the Pre-Crisis version of Leslie Thompkins is established to have spent a year inside a struggling Gotham City under a strange dome. She is devoting her time as a therapist. One of her patients is Guy Gardner; Leslie tries to help Guy understand that his devotion to the city's children is just as heroic as his past exploits as Green Lantern.

In other media

Television

Animation
Dr. Leslie Thompkins appears in several episodes of Batman: The Animated Series, voiced by Diana Muldaur. She is depicted as a lifelong friend of Bruce Wayne, having attended medical school with his father, Thomas. She knows Batman's secret identity and serves as his on-site doctor, confidentially treating injuries that Bruce Wayne could not be publicly known to have without raising suspicion. When the series was retooled as The New Batman Adventures, Leslie was absent except for a cameo appearance in the episode "Chemistry".

Live action
 Leslie "Lee" Thompkins appears in the live-action series Gotham, played by Morena Baccarin. This version of the character is a physician who has an on-off relationship with Jim Gordon and had no connections with Thomas Wayne. She later briefly serves as the leader of the Narrows alongside Edward Nygma. By the end of the series, she is married to Gordon and helping him raise his daughter, Barbara Lee Gordon.
 Leslie appears in the Titans episode "Lazarus" portrayed by Krista Bridges. While her connections with Bruce remain intact, this version is a therapist and former colleague of Jonathan Crane. Bruce assigned Jason Todd to therapy with her in order for him to be cleared on being Robin again. After two sessions where Jason figured out that Bruce is going to replace him, Jason briefly called up Leslie calling her a liar before visiting Jonathan Crane.

Film
Leslie Thompkins appears as Sister Leslie in the animated film Batman: Gotham by Gaslight, voiced by Grey Griffin.

Short story collection
In Marco Palmieri's short story "Best of All", featured in the non-canonical anthology The Further Adventures of The Joker, the Joker tells Batman that Leslie is his mother. He says that she committed him to a mental institution as a child after he murdered his father, who was abusing her. The story is ambiguous as to whether the Joker is telling the truth, with Leslie attributing the story to her habit of referring to various orphans she cared for in the past as her 'children'.

References

Batman characters
Characters created by Dennis O'Neil
Comics characters introduced in 1976
DC Comics television characters
DC Comics female characters
Fictional physicians
Fictional medical examiners
Gotham City Police Department officers